Igor Vekić (born 6 May 1998) is a Slovenian footballer who plays for Paços de Ferreira, on loan from Bravo, as a goalkeeper.

Club career
Vekić made his Slovenian PrvaLiga debut for Bravo on 9 August 2019 in a game against Aluminij.

References

External links
 
 Igor Vekić at NZS 

1998 births
Living people
Slovenian footballers
Slovenian expatriate footballers
Slovenia youth international footballers
Slovenia under-21 international footballers
Association football goalkeepers
Slovenian Second League players
Slovenian PrvaLiga players
Primeira Liga players
NK Bravo players
F.C. Paços de Ferreira players
Slovenian expatriate sportspeople in Portugal
Expatriate footballers in Portugal